Margit Catharina Lindgren (born 10 May 1963), known as Catarina Lindgren, is a Swedish figure skating coach, choreographer, and former competitor. She is a four-time (1981–1984) Swedish national champion. She represented Sweden at the 1984 Winter Olympics, where she placed 20th.

Personal life
Margit Catharina Lindgren was born on 10 May 1963 in Piteå, Norrbotten. She married American figure skater Tom Dickson in 1986 and their twins, a boy and a girl, were born in the late 1990s. Their son is named Kai. And daughter named Mikaela.

Career 
Lindgren became a four-time Swedish national champion in the first half of the 1980s. She was sent to the 1984 Winter Olympics in Sarajevo, where she placed 20th.

After ending her competitive career, Lindgren skated with Ice Capades. She then became a coach and choreographer. As of 2017, she is based at the Broadmoor World Arena in Colorado Springs, Colorado.

Her students and clients include:

Competitive highlights

References

External links
 

Swedish female single skaters
Olympic figure skaters of Sweden
Figure skaters at the 1984 Winter Olympics
Living people
1963 births
Figure skating choreographers
People from Piteå
Sportspeople from Norrbotten County